The Neuburger Bank Formation is a geologic formation in Austria. It preserves fossils dating back to the Jurassic period.

See also 

 List of fossiliferous stratigraphic units in Austria

References

External links 
 

Geologic formations of Austria
Jurassic System of Europe
Jurassic Austria